The 2019–20 NBL season was the 31st season for the Sydney Kings in the NBL.

Roster

Depth chart

Preseason 
The Kings' pre-season games consisted of three regular pre-season games and two NBL Blitz games. The first game was against Hills Select, before the Kings travelled to Tasmania to participate in the NBL Blitz during September, with games against the South East Melbourne Phoenix and the Perth Wildcats. They then had games against the New Zealand Breakers and the Illawarra Hawks.

Ladder

Game log 

|- style="background-color:#ccffcc;"
| 1
| 14 September
| @ Hills Select
| W 109-67
| Craig Moller (22)
| Jordan Hunter, Jae'Sean Tate (8)
| Bruce, Lisch, Walker (4)
| Hills Basketball Stadium
| 1-0

|- style="background-color:#ffcccc;"
| 1
| 20 September
| South East Melbourne Phoenix
| L 87-96
| Casper Ware (19)
| Jae'Sean Tate (7)
| Shaun Bruce (4)
| Devonport Recreation & Function Centre
| 0-1
|- style="background-color:#ccffcc;"
| 2
| 22 September
| Perth Wildcats
| W 71-103
| Didi Louzada (29)
| Jordan Hunter (10)
| Louzada, Moller, Ware (3)
| Derwent Entertainment Centre
| 1-1

|- style="background-color:#ccffcc;"
| 2
| 26 September
| New Zealand Breakers
| W 81-64
| Casper Ware (26)
| Andrew Bogut (8)
| Kevin Lisch (4)
| Sydney Uni Sports & Aquatic Centre
| 2-0
|- style="background-color:#ccffcc;"
| 3
| 29 September
| @ Illawarra Hawks
| W 96-106
| Didi Louzada (24)
| Jordan Hunter (11)
| Kevin Lisch, Jae'Sean Tate (4)
| WIN Entertainment Centre
| 3-0

Regular season

Standings

Game log 
The regular season of the NBL consisted of 28 games, with the King's 14 home games played at Qudos Bank Arena.

|- style="background-color:#ccffcc;"
| 1
| 4 October
| @ Cairns Taipans
| W 71-79
| Casper Ware (23)
| Andrew Bogut (12)
| Casper Ware, Andrew Bogut (5)
| Cairns Convention Centre 
| 1-0
|- style="background-color:#ccffcc;"
| 2
| 12 October
| Adelaide 36ers
| W 102-80
| Brad Newley (18)
| Jae'Sean Tate (7)
| Shaun Bruce (7)
| Qudos Bank Arena
| 2-0
|- style="background-color:#ccffcc;"
| 3
| 18 October
| New Zealand Breakers
| W 96-91
| Casper Ware (27)
| Andrew Bogut (15)
| Andrew Bogut, Casper Ware (5)
| Qudos Bank Arena
| 3-0
|- style="background-color:#ccffcc;"
| 4
| 20 October
| @ New Zealand Breakers
| W 66-76
| Casper Ware (17)
| Andrew Bogut (16)
| Shaun Bruce (3)
| Spark Arena
| 4-0
|- style="background-color:#ccffcc;"
| 5
| 26 October
| Brisbane Bullets
| W 94-79
| Casper Ware (17)
| Andrew Bogut (11)
| Casper Ware (5)
| Qudos Bank Arena
| 5-0

|- style="background-color:#ccffcc;"
| 6
| 2 November
| @ Adelaide 36ers
| W 96-98
| Andrew Bogut (18)
| Andrew Bogut (12)
| Jae'Sean Tate (5)
| Adelaide Entertainment Centre
| 6-0
|- style="background-color:#ffcccc;"
| 7
| 4 November
| @ Melbourne United
| L 107-104
| Casper Ware (34)
| Andrew Bogut (8)
| Shaun Bruce (8)
| Melbourne Arena 
| 6-1
|- style="background-color:#ccffcc;"
| 8
| 8 November
| @ Brisbane Bullets
| W 85-95
| Brad Newley (20)
| Andrew Bogut (8)
| Shaun Bruce (8)
| Nissan Arena
| 7-1
|- style="background-color:#ccffcc;"
| 9
| 10 November
| Perth Wildcats
| W 104-85
| Didi Louzada (28)
| Jae'Sean Tate (8)
| Shaun Bruce (7)
| Qudos Bank Arena
| 8-1
|- style="background-color:#ccffcc;"
| 10
| 17 November
| Illawarra Hawks
| W 92-87
| Jae'Sean Tate (24)
| Andrew Bogut (9)
| Casper Ware (6)
| Qudos Bank Arena
| 9-1
|- style="background-color:#ccffcc;"
| 11
| 23 November
| @ South East Melbourne Phoenix
| W 86-90
| Casper Ware (25)
| Andrew Bogut (10)
| Bogut, Bruce, Ware (4)
| Melbourne Arena
| 10-1

|- style="background-color:#ccffcc;"
| 12
| 1 December
| Melbourne United
| W 111-101
| Casper Ware (27)
| Andrew Bogut (8)
| Casper Ware (5)
| Qudos Bank Arena
| 11-1
|- style="background-color:#ffcccc;"
| 13
| 6 December
| @ Perth Wildcats
| L 96-77
| Casper Ware (13)
| Andrew Bogut (8)
| Shaun Bruce (4)
| RAC Arena
| 11-2
|- style="background-color:#ffcccc;"
| 14
| 8 December
| Cairns Taipans
| L 98-109
| Casper Ware (23)
| Andrew Bogut (12)
| Casper Ware (7)
| Qudos Bank Arena
| 11-3
|- style="background-color:#ccffcc;"
| 15
| 14 December
| @ Melbourne United
| W 81-104
| Casper Ware (27)
| Jae'Sean Tate (12)
| Shaun Bruce (4)
| Melbourne Arena
| 12-3
|- style="background-color:#ffcccc;"
| 16
| 21 December
| @ Brisbane Bullets
| L 87-80
| Casper Ware (26)
| Xavier Cooks (7)
| Casper Ware (3)
| Nissan Arena
| 12-4
|- style="background-color:#ccffcc;"
| 17
| 23 December
| South East Melbourne Phoenix
| W 110-98
| Daniel Kickert (18)
| Xavier Cooks (9)
| Casper Ware (7)
| Qudos Bank Arena
| 13-4
|- style="background-color:#ffcccc;"
| 18
| 28 December
| Perth Wildcats
| L 85-98
| Casper Ware (33)
| Andrew Bogut (12)
| Shaun Bruce (4)
| Qudos Bank Arena
| 13-5
|- style="background-color:#ffcccc;"
| 19
| 31 December
| @ Illawarra Hawks
| L 85-80
| Jae'Sean Tate (23)
| Xavier Cooks (9)
| Daniel Kickert (5)
| WIN Entertainment Centre
| 13-6

|- style="background-color:#ccffcc;"
| 20
| 4 January
| Adelaide 36ers
| W 91-77
| Brad Newley, Jae'Sean Tate (20)
| Andrew Bogut (10)
| Casper Ware (6)
| Qudos Bank Arena
| 14-6
|- style="background-color:#ccffcc;"
| 21
| 11 January
| Cairns Taipans
| W 92=83
| Daniel Kickert (18)
| Bogut, Cooks, Tate (8)
| Casper Ware (4)
| Qudos Bank Arena
| 15-6
|- style="background-color:#ffcccc;"
| 22
| 17 January
| @ New Zealand Breakers
| L 86-81
| Jae'Sean Tate (22)
| Xavier Cooks (10)
| Casper Ware (5)
| TSB Stadium
| 15-7
|- style="background-color:#ccffcc;"
| 23
| 19 January
| South East Melbourne Phoenix
| W 98-81
| Didi Louzada (18)
| Andrew Bogut (11)
| Shaun Bruce, Casper Ware (6)
| Qudos Bank Arena
| 16-7
|- style="background-color:#ccffcc;"
| 24
| 24 January
| @ Illawarra Hawks
| W 79-102
| Jae'Sean Tate, Deshon Taylor (17)
| Xavier Cooks (11)
| Shaun Bruce (5)
| WIN Entertainment Centre
| 17-7
|- style="background-color:#ccffcc;"
| 25
| 26 January
| Melbourne United
| W 106-88
| Casper Ware (26)
| Xavier Cooks (10)
| Andrew Bogut (9)
| Qudos Bank Arena
| 18-7

|- style="background-color:#ffcccc;"
| 26
| 1 February
| @ Perth Wildcats
| L 110-100
| Jae'Sean Tate (23)
| Jae'Sean Tate (12)
| Shaun Bruce (5)
| RAC Arena
| 18-8
|- style="background-color:#ccffcc;"
| 27
| 9 February
| @ South East Melbourne Phoenix
| W 96-99
| Casper Ware (24)
| Xavier Cooks (13)
| Xavier Cooks, Brad Newley (3)
| Melbourne Arena
| 19-8
|- style="background-color:#ccffcc;"
| 28
| 14 February
| Illawarra Hawks
| W 98-82
| Jae'Sean Tate, Casper Ware (19)
| Xavier Cooks (11)
| Newley, Taylor, Ware (3)3
| Qudos Bank Arena
| 20-8

Postseason

|- style="background-color:#ccffcc;"
| 1
| 29 February
| Melbourne United
| W 86-80
| Jae'Sean Tate (23)
| Andrew Bogut (10)
| Casper Ware (5)
| Qudos Bank Arena
| 1-0
|- style="background-color:#ffcccc;"
| 2
| 2 March
| @ Melbourne United
| L 125-80
| Jae'Sean Tate (18)
| Xavier Cooks (7)
| Didi Louzada (2)
| Melbourne Arena
| 1-1
|- style="background-color:#ccffcc;"
| 3
| 5 March
| Melbourne United
| W 89-87
| Jae'Sean Tate (2)
| Xavier Cooks (9)
| Kevin Lisch (4)
| Qudos Bank Arena
| 2-1

|- style="background-color:#ffcccc;"
| 1
| 8 March
| Perth Wildcats
| L 86-88
| Andrew Bogut (18)
| Andrew Bogut (12)
| Casper Ware (4)4
| Qudos Bank Arena
| 0-1
|- style="background-color:#ccffcc;"
| 2
| 13 March
| @ Perth Wildcats
| W 85-97
| Jae'Sean Tate (20)
| Andrew Bogut (13)
| Brad Newley (5)
| RAC Arena
| 1-1
|- style="background-color:#ffcccc;"
| 3
| 15 March
| Perth Wildcats
| L 96-111
| Jae'Sean Tate (20)
| Xavier Cooks (9)
| Andrew Bogut, Shaun Bruce (3)
| Qudos Bank Arena
| 1-2

Awards

Player of the Week 

Round 3, Andrew Bogut

See also 

 2019–20 NBL season
 Sydney Kings

References

External links 

 Official Website

Sydney Kings seasons
Sydney Kings seasons
Sydney Kings
Sydney Kings seasons